Cyndi Wang Hsin-ling (born 5 September 1982) is a Taiwanese singer and actress. Wang debuted her musical career as she released her debut album, Begin... (2003). Besides her musical career, Wang has starred in many TV dramas, including The Car Is In Pursuit (2000), Westside Story (2003), Heaven's Wedding Gown (2004), and Smiling Pasta (2006). She started her first tour in 2016, and second in 2019. Wang has been active in the Taiwanese music scene for more than twenty years and at one point, she was one of the top female popstars in the Mandopop industry, regularly selling over a million copies of her every album across Asia. She is widely known as one of the Mandopop Princess or The Taiwanese Sweetheart.

Career
Wang graduated from Okazaki Arts School and completed a drama course at Hwa Kang Arts School. Her father is Waishengren from Qingdao; while her mother is Hakka. Wang is a Buddhist, and has one younger brother. After their parents divorced in 1992, Wang and her brother were raised by their mother.

Wang took part in a talent contest held by Avex Taiwan in 2003. After the competition, she was called again and given a chance to go to Japan. In order to pursue her dream, she decided to take on the challenge and go to Avex's music studio in Japan to learn singing and dancing for three months. She earned herself a graduation certificate with an impressive performance from Avex Trax. These achievements made Avex Taiwan impressed with her, and she was offered a contract by Avex Taiwan. From that time she has been involved in her entertainment career.

Discography

Studio albums

Compilation albums

Live albums

Soundtracks

Filmography

Feature films

Short films

Television dramas

Music videos
 "Degenerate" by Jones Shi
 "Love’s Option" by Jing Chang

Awards

References

External links
 
 

Taiwanese film actresses
Taiwanese television actresses
1982 births
Living people
Taiwanese Mandopop singers
Hakka musicians
Taiwanese people of Hakka descent
Taiwanese Buddhists
People from Hsinchu
Universal Music Group artists
21st-century Taiwanese actresses
21st-century Taiwanese singers
21st-century Taiwanese women singers